Jill Meager is an English actor, artist and painter.

Career
Meager studied modern languages at Trinity Hall, Cambridge. She worked for several years as an actor before training as a psychodynamic counsellor. She also worked as a stand-up comedian before studying fine art at the Putney School of Art and Design

As an actor
Meager has appeared in many roles on television and in film, including Lucy Eyelesbarrow in 4:50 from Paddington, one of the BBC's adaptations of Miss Marple novels, in 1987. She played Katherine Chipping in the 1984 BBC adaption of the book Goodbye, Mr. Chips. She played opposite Charles Dance in the BBC spy thriller The Secret Servant by Gavin Lyall. She had a role in the "unofficial" James Bond film Never Say Never Again in 1983, and starred opposite Alan Bates and Lambert Wilson in the feature film Sins of a Father based on a Graham Swift novel. Her other television appearances include Taggart, Bergerac and Hannay.

As an artist
She coaches in speech writing, media and performance training.  She has worked in many of the major United Kingdom advertising agencies and media organisations, as well as FTSE 100 companies, running courses and one-on-one sessions. She is also a very successful wildlife artist. Her work is held in collections around the world and she is represented by three UK galleries.

References

External links
Official website

Spiritbase.com
Jill Meager on Twitter

Living people
English portrait painters
English film actresses
English stage actresses
English television actresses
Year of birth missing (living people)